Alban Maginness (born 9 July 1950) is an Irish Social Democratic and Labour Party (SDLP) politician who was a Member of the Northern Ireland Assembly (MLA) for Belfast North from 1998 to 2016.

Early life and education
Maginness was born in Holywood, County Down.  He completed his grammar school education at St. Malachy's College, Belfast. He then attended the University of Ulster and Queen's University of Belfast where he undertook legal training. He was called to the Bar in 1984.

Whilst at university he became involved in the non-violent protests organised by the Northern Ireland Civil Rights Association. Maginness participated in the famous civil rights march in Derry in 1972 at which British troops killed 14 unarmed civilians. This event, now termed Bloody Sunday, has gone down in Northern Ireland politics as one of the turning points in The Troubles that contributed to the development of the Provisional IRA.

Political career
Maginness became increasingly involved in politics and became a member of the Social Democratic and Labour Party. He stood unsuccessfully for the party in East Belfast in the 1975 Constitutional Convention election and North Belfast in the 1982 Assembly election.

He has been an elected member of Belfast City Council since 1985 and in 1997 he became the first Catholic politician to hold the position of Lord Mayor of Belfast. In 1998 he was elected to the Northern Ireland Assembly to represent Belfast North.
 
He was Chair of the SDLP from 1984 to 1991.

In November 2008 Maginness had his trademark moustache shaved off for the BBC's Children in Need.

Maginness was the SDLP candidate for the 2009 European Election.

Maginness accused the Secretary of State of interning dissident republican Marian Price without trial, saying "We do not support putting people away in prison because of intelligence or because of some political point of view and we are convinced that she has been detained without trial because of that by the secretary of state."

Having served as an MLA for North Belfast from 1998, Maginness decided not to stand for election in 2016. He was replaced by Nichola Mallon.

References

External links
Biography: NI Assembly
SDLP Councillor Alban Maginness MLA: Official Website

Northern Ireland Assembly | AIMS Portal | Plenary Item Details

1950 births
Living people
Members of Belfast City Council
Social Democratic and Labour Party MLAs
Members of the Northern Ireland Forum
Northern Ireland MLAs 1998–2003
Northern Ireland MLAs 2003–2007
Northern Ireland MLAs 2007–2011
Northern Ireland MLAs 2011–2016
People educated at St Malachy's College
Alumni of Queen's University Belfast
Alumni of Ulster University
Barristers from Northern Ireland
Members of the Bar of Northern Ireland
Lord Mayors of Belfast
People from Holywood, County Down